New Zealand at the 1930 British Empire Games was represented by a team of 22 competitors and three officials. Team selection for the Games in Hamilton, Ontario, Canada, was the responsibility of the New Zealand Olympic and British Empire Games Association. New Zealand's flagbearer at the opening ceremony was Stan Lay.

These were the first British Empire Games, although in 1911 there was an Empire sports competition at the Festival of Empire in London. New Zealand has competed in every games since.

Medal tables

Competitors
The following table lists the number of New Zealand competitors participating at the Games per sport/discipline.

Athletics

Track

Field

Diving

Lawn bowls

Rowing

Swimming

Officials
 Team manager – Rex Hobbs
 Chaperone – Jane Pidgeon
 Rowing coach – Harry Ayres

See also
New Zealand Olympic Committee
New Zealand at the Commonwealth Games
New Zealand at the 1928 Summer Olympics
New Zealand at the 1932 Summer Olympics

References 

Ron Palenski & Terry Maddaford: The Games Auckland: Moa Publications Ltd.

External links
NZOC website on the 1930 games
Commonwealth Games Federation website
Athletes in the 1966 Encyclopaedia of New Zealand has a paragraph on these Games

1930
Nations at the 1930 British Empire Games
British Empire Games